Go Soeda successfully defended his title, defeating Malek Jaziri 6–1, 3–6, 7–5 in the final.

Seeds

Draw

Finals

Top half

Bottom half

References
 Main Draw
 Qualifying Draw

Green World ATP Challenger - Singles
2012 Singles
2012 in Chinese tennis